The UEFA Euro 2020 qualifying tournament was a football competition that was played from March 2019 to November 2020 to determine the 24 UEFA member men's national teams that advanced to the UEFA Euro 2020 final tournament, played across Europe in June and July 2021. The competition was linked with the 2018–19 UEFA Nations League, giving countries a secondary route to qualify for the final tournament. For the first time since 1976, no team automatically qualified for the UEFA European Championship as the host country.

The national teams of all 55 UEFA member associations entered the qualifying process, with Kosovo taking part for the first time. The group stage draw took place at the Convention Centre Dublin, Republic of Ireland, on 2 December 2018.

Qualified teams

{| class="wikitable sortable"
|-
! Team
! Qualified as
! Qualified on
!data-sort-type="number"| Previous appearances in tournament
|-
|  ||  ||  || 5 (1972, 1980, 1984, 2000, 2016)
|-
|  ||  ||  || 9 (1968, 1980, 1988, 1996, 2000, 2004, 2008, 2012, 2016)
|-
|  ||  ||  || 11 (1960, 1964, 1968, 1972, 1988, 1992, 1996, 2004, 2008, 2012, 2016)
|-
|  ||  ||  || 3 (2008, 2012, 2016)
|-
|  ||  ||  || 2 (2012, 2016)
|-
|  ||  ||  || 10 (1964, 1980, 1984, 1988, 1996, 2000, 2004, 2008, 2012, 2016)
|-
|  ||  ||  || 9 (1960, 1984, 1992, 1996, 2000, 2004, 2008, 2012, 2016)
|-
|  ||  ||  || 4 (1996, 2000, 2008, 2016)
|-
|  ||  ||  || 9 (1968, 1980, 1988, 1992, 1996, 2000, 2004, 2012, 2016)
|-
|  ||  ||  || 9 (1960, 1976, 1980, 1996, 2000, 2004, 2008, 2012, 2016)
|-
|  ||  ||  || 0 (debut)
|-
|  ||  ||  || 6 (1992, 2000, 2004, 2008, 2012, 2016)
|-
|  ||  ||  || 5 (1996, 2004, 2008, 2012, 2016)
|-
|  ||  ||  || 2 (2008, 2016)
|-
|  ||  ||  || 9 (1976, 1980, 1988, 1992, 1996, 2000, 2004, 2008, 2012)
|-
|  ||  ||  || 12 (1972, 1976, 1980, 1984, 1988, 1992, 1996, 2000, 2004, 2008, 2012, 2016)
|-
|  ||  ||  || 7 (1984, 1996, 2000, 2004, 2008, 2012, 2016)
|-
|  ||  ||  || 4 (1996, 2004, 2008, 2016)
|-
|  ||  ||  || 8 (1964, 1984, 1988, 1992, 1996, 2000, 2004, 2012)
|-
|  ||  ||  || 1 (2016)
|-
|  ||  ||  || 0 (debut)
|-
|  ||  ||  || 3 (1964, 1972, 2016)
|-
|  ||  ||  || 4 (1960, 1976, 1980, 2016)
|-
|  ||  ||  || 2 (1992, 1996)
|}

Format
There was no automatic qualifying berth, and all 55 UEFA national teams, including the twelve national teams whose countries were selected to stage matches, had to compete in the qualifiers for the 24 places at the finals tournament. As the host cities were appointed by UEFA in September 2014, before qualifying, it was possible for the national teams from the host cities to fail to qualify for the finals tournament.

With the creation of the UEFA Nations League starting in 2018, the 2018–19 UEFA Nations League was linked with UEFA Euro qualifying, providing teams another chance to qualify for the tournament. The qualifying process guaranteed that at least one team from each division of the previous Nations League season would qualify for the final tournament (either directly or through the play-offs).

The main qualifying process began with the qualifying group stage in March 2019, instead of late 2018 immediately following the 2018 FIFA World Cup, and ended in November 2019. The qualifiers were played on double matchdays in March, June, September, October and November 2019. As with the 2016 qualifying tournament, the group stage decided 20 of the 24 teams that advanced to the final tournament. Following the admission of Kosovo to UEFA in May 2016, it was announced that the 55 teams would be drawn into ten groups after the completion of the league phase of the 2018–19 UEFA Nations League, and the draw seeding would be based on the overall rankings of the 2018–19 UEFA Nations League. There were five groups of five teams, and five groups of six teams, with the four UEFA Nations League Finals participants guaranteed to be drawn into groups of five teams (so they could compete in the Nations League Finals in June 2019). The top two teams in each of the ten groups qualified for the final tournament.

Following the qualifying group stage, the qualifying play-offs took place to determine the remaining four teams for the final tournament. Unlike previous editions, the participants of the play-offs were not decided based on results from the qualifying group stage. Instead, sixteen teams were selected based on their performance in the 2018–19 UEFA Nations League. These teams were divided into four paths, each containing four teams, with one team from each path qualifying for the final tournament. Each league had its own play-off path if at least four teams had not already qualified in the conventional qualifying group stage. The Nations League group winners automatically qualified for the play-off path of their league. If a group winner had already qualified through the qualifying group stage, they were replaced by the next best-ranked team in the same league. However, if there were not enough non-qualified teams in the same league, then the spot would go to the next best team in the overall ranking. However, group winners could not face teams from a higher league.

Each play-off path featured two single-leg semi-finals, and one single-leg final. In the semi-finals, the best-ranked team hosted the fourth-ranked team, and the second-ranked team hosted the third-ranked team. The host of the final was drawn between the winners of the semi-final pairings. The four play-off path winners joined the twenty teams that had already qualified for the final tournament. The UEFA Executive Committee approved the use of the video assistant referee system for the play-offs during their meeting in Nyon, Switzerland on 4 December 2019, the first time the technology was used in the qualifying competition.

Tiebreakers for group ranking
If two or more teams were equal on points on completion of the group matches, the following tie-breaking criteria were applied:

 Higher number of points obtained in the matches played among the teams in question;
 Superior goal difference in matches played among the teams in question;
 Higher number of goals scored in the matches played among the teams in question;
 Higher number of goals scored away from home in the matches played among the teams in question;
 If, after having applied criteria 1 to 4, teams still had an equal ranking, criteria 1 to 4 were reapplied exclusively to the matches between the teams in question to determine their final rankings. If this procedure did not lead to a decision, criteria 6 to 10 applied;
 Superior goal difference in all group matches;
 Higher number of goals scored in all group matches;
 Higher number of away goals scored in all group matches;
 Higher number of wins in all group matches;
 Higher number of away wins in all group matches;
 Fair play conduct in all group matches (1 point for a single yellow card, 3 points for a red card as a consequence of two yellow cards, 3 points for a direct red card, 4 points for a yellow card followed by a direct red card);
 Position in the UEFA Nations League overall ranking.
Notes

Criteria for overall ranking
To determine the overall rankings of the European Qualifiers, results against teams in sixth place were discarded and the following criteria were applied:
 Position in the group;
 Higher number of points;
 Superior goal difference;
 Higher number of goals scored;
 Higher number of goals scored away from home;
 Higher number of wins;
 Higher number of wins away from home;
 Fair play conduct (1 point for a single yellow card, 3 points for a red card as a consequence of two yellow cards, 3 points for a direct red card, 4 points for a yellow card followed by a direct red card);
 Position in the UEFA Nations League overall ranking.

Schedule
Below was the schedule of the UEFA Euro 2020 qualifying campaign.

Due to the COVID-19 pandemic in Europe, the qualifying play-offs, originally scheduled for 26 and 31 March 2020, were postponed by UEFA on 17 March 2020. Afterwards, UEFA tentatively scheduled for the matches to take place on 4 and 9 June 2020. However, the play-offs were later postponed indefinitely by UEFA on 1 April 2020. The scheduling of the play-offs was reviewed by the UEFA Executive Committee during their meeting on 17 June 2020. At the meeting, UEFA decided to stage the play-off semi-finals on 8 October 2020, and the finals on 12 November 2020. To facilitate this, an additional matchday was added to both international windows, allowing for triple-headers to be played in order to complete the league phase of the 2020–21 UEFA Nations League as scheduled. The changes to the International Match Calendar for October and November 2020 were approved by the FIFA Council on 25 June 2020.

The fixture list was confirmed by UEFA on 2 December 2018 following the draw.

Draw
The qualifying group stage draw was held on 2 December 2018, 12:00 CET (11:00 local time), at the Convention Centre Dublin in Dublin, Republic of Ireland. The 55 teams were drawn into 10 groups: five groups of five teams (Groups A–E) and five groups of six teams (Groups F–J).

The teams were seeded based on the 2018–19 UEFA Nations League overall ranking. The four participants of the 2019 UEFA Nations League Finals in June 2019 were placed in a separate pot and drawn into Groups A–D which only had five teams so that they only had to play eight qualifying matches, leaving two free matchdays to play in Nations League Finals. The following restrictions were also applied with computer assistance:
Host teams: In order to allow all 12 teams from the host associations to have a chance to qualify as group winners and runners-up, a maximum of two were placed in each group: Azerbaijan, Denmark, England, Germany, Hungary, Italy, Netherlands, Republic of Ireland, Romania, Russia, Scotland, Spain.
Prohibited clashes: For political reasons, matches between following pairs of teams were considered prohibited clashes, unable to be drawn into the same group: Gibraltar / Spain, Kosovo / Bosnia and Herzegovina, Kosovo / Serbia. (Armenia / Azerbaijan and Russia / Ukraine were also identified as prohibited clashes, but the teams in these pairs were in the same pots for the draw.)
Winter venues: A maximum of two teams whose venues were identified as having high or medium risk of severe winter conditions were placed in each group: Belarus, Estonia, Faroe Islands, Finland, Iceland, Latvia, Lithuania, Norway, Russia, Ukraine.
The three "hard winter venues" (Faroe Islands, Finland, Iceland) generally could not host games in March or November; the others played as few home matches as possible in March and November.
Excessive travel: A maximum of one pair of teams identified with excessive travel distance in relation to other countries were placed in each group:
Azerbaijan: with Iceland, Portugal. (Gibraltar was also identified with Azerbaijan for excessive travel distance, but the teams were in the same pot for the draw.)
Iceland: with Armenia, Cyprus, Georgia, Israel.
Kazakhstan: with Andorra, England, France, Iceland, Malta, Northern Ireland, Portugal, Republic of Ireland, Scotland, Spain, Wales. (Faroe Islands and Gibraltar were also identified with Kazakhstan for excessive travel distance, but the teams were in the same pot for the draw.)

Seeding
The teams were seeded based on the November 2018 UEFA Nations League overall rankings. Teams in italics are final tournament hosts. Teams in bold qualified for the final tournament.

Summary

Groups
Matches took place from 21 March to 19 November 2019.

Group A

Group B

Group C

Group D

Group E

Group F

Group G

Group H

Group I

Group J

Play-offs

Teams that failed in the qualifying group stage could still qualify for the final tournament through the play-offs. Each league in the UEFA Nations League was allocated one of the four remaining final tournament spots. Four teams from each league that had not already qualified for the European Championship finals competed in the play-offs of their league. The play-off berths were first allocated to each Nations League group winner, and if any of the group winners had already qualified for the European Championship finals, then to the next best ranked team of the league, etc.

Team selection

Draw

Path A

Path B

Path C

Path D

Goalscorers

Overall ranking
The overall rankings were used for seeding in the final tournament draw. Results against sixth-placed teams were not considered in the ranking.

Team of the European Qualifiers
Following the completion of the qualifying group stage, UEFA released a "Team of the European Qualifiers" on 29 November 2019. The team featured 11 players based on accumulated scores from the FedEx Performance Zone player rankings, which was based on form from qualifying. Additional weighting was given for teams that played only eight matches.

References

External links

UEFA Euro 2020, UEFA.com
European Qualifiers, UEFA.com

 
Qualifying
2020
Euro qualifying
Euro qualifying
March 2019 sports events in Europe
June 2019 sports events in Europe
September 2019 sports events in Europe
October 2019 sports events in Europe
November 2019 sports events in Europe
October 2020 sports events in Europe
November 2020 sports events in Europe